Kōwhai ( or ) are small woody legume trees within the genus Sophora in the family Fabaceae that are native to New Zealand. There are eight species, with Sophora microphylla and S. tetraptera being the most recognised as large trees. Their natural habitat is beside streams and on the edges of forest, in lowland or mountain open areas.  Kōwhai trees grow throughout the country and are a common feature in New Zealand gardens. Outside of New Zealand, kōwhai tend to be restricted to mild temperate maritime climates. 

The blooms of the kōwhai are widely regarded as being New Zealand's unofficial national flower. As such, it is often incorporated as a visual shorthand for the country, such as in Meghan Markle's wedding veil which included distinctive flora representing all Commonwealth nations.

Kōwhai is also the Māori word for the colour yellow. The spelling kowhai (without a macron) is common in New Zealand English.

Species

The eight species of kōwhai are: 
 Sophora chathamica, coastal kōwhai
 Sophora fulvida, Waitakere kōwhai
 Sophora godleyi, Godley's kōwhai
 Sophora longicarinata, limestone kōwhai
 Sophora microphylla, small-leaved kōwhai
 Sophora molloyi, Cook Strait kōwhai
 Sophora prostrata, prostrate kōwhai
 Sophora tetraptera, large-leaved kōwhai

Description and ecology

Most species of kōwhai grow to around 8 m high and have fairly smooth bark with small leaves. S. microphylla has smaller leaves (0.5–0.7 cm long by 0.3–0.4 cm wide) and flowers (2.5–3.5 cm long) than S. tetraptera, which has leaves of 1–2 cm long and flowers that are 3–5 cm long.

The very distinctive seed pods that appear after flowering are almost segmented, and each contains six or more smooth, hard seeds. Most species have yellow seeds, but Sophora prostrata has black ones. The seeds of Sophora microphylla can be very numerous and the presence of many hundreds of these distinctively yellow seeds on the ground quickly identifies the presence of a nearby kōwhai tree. Many species of kōwhai are semi-deciduous and lose most of their leaves immediately after flowering in October or November, but quickly produce new leaves. Flowering of kōwhai is staggered from July through to November, meaning each tree will get attention from birds such as tūī, kererū and bellbird. Tūī are very attracted to kōwhai and will fly long distances to get a sip of its nectar.

The wood of kōwhai is dense and strong and has been used in the past for tools and machinery. 

Sophora is one of the four genera of native legumes in New Zealand; the other three are Carmichaelia, Clianthus, and Montigena.

Cultivation
Kōwhai can be grown from seed or tip cuttings in spring and autumn. The dark or bright yellow seeds germinate best after chitting and being soaked in water for several hours. They can also benefit from a several minute submersion in boiling water to soften the hard shell and then being kept in the same water, taken off boil, for several hours to soak up the water. Young kōwhai are quite frost tender, so cuttings or seedlings should be planted in their second year when they are 30 cm or higher.

If grown from seed, kōwhai can take many years to flower, the number of years varies depending on the species.

S. prostrata, sometimes called "little baby", is used as a bonsai tree. It grows up to two metres high, has divaricating stems, and sparse smallish leaves.

Dangers
All parts of the kōwhai, but particularly the seeds, are poisonous to humans. However, there do not appear to have been any confirmed cases in humans of severe poisoning following ingestion of kōwhai in New Zealand.

Traditional Māori use
Traditionally the Māori used the flexible branches as a construction material in their houses and to snare birds. The kōwhai flowers were a source of yellow dye. Also, when the kōwhai flowers bloom, in late winter and early spring, it is time to plant kumara (sweet potato). 

Māori also used the kōwhai tree as medicine. Wedges made of kowhai stem were used to split wood, it was used for fences and in whare (Maori hut) construction, implements and weapons. The bark was heated in a calabash with hot stones, and made into a poultice to treat wounds or rubbed on a sore back or made into an infusion to treat bruising or muscular pains. If someone was bitten by a seal, an infusion (wai kōwhai) was prepared from kōwhai and applied to the wounds and the patient was said to recover within days.

Pre-human forests
Studies of accumulated dried vegetation in the pre-human mid-late Holocene period suggests a low Sophora microphylla forest ecosystem in Central Otago that was used and perhaps maintained by giant moa birds, for both nesting material and food. Neither the forests nor moa existed when European settlers came to the area in the 1850s.

References

Sophora
Trees of New Zealand
Plants used in traditional Māori medicine
National symbols of New Zealand
Plant common names